Aenetus splendens is a moth of the family Hepialidae. It is known from New South Wales and Queensland.

The wingspan is about 70 mm for females and 50 mm for males. Adult males have green forewings with white diagonal bars. The hindwings are shiny pale grey. Females have green forewings with variable red markings and red hindwings.

The larvae bore in the stems of saplings of various plants, including Syzygium smithii, Callistemon, Eucalyptus, Callicoma serratifolia, Trema aspera, Casuarina, Dodonaea, Lantana camara, Pandorea pandorana and Rubus. They create a web made of silk and sawdust which covers the entrance to the tunnel. Pupation takes place inside the tunnel.

References

Moths described in 1864
Hepialidae